The James Monroe Museum and Memorial Library is a historic museum at 908 Charles Street in Fredericksburg, Virginia.  It is located on the site of the James Monroe Law Office, used by future United States President James Monroe from 1786 to 1789.  It was declared a National Historic Landmark in 1966.  It is now owned by the Commonwealth of Virginia and operated by the University of Mary Washington. The museum features original objects and memorabilia related to James Monroe, and includes items relating to other members of his family, including dresses worn by First Lady Elizabeth Monroe.

Description and history

The Monroe Museum is located in central Fredericksburg, on the west side of Charles Street, between William and George Streets.  It is housed in a two-part building that is roughly L-shaped.  The older portion is a long 1-1/2 story brick structure, with a gabled roof, built in 1758.  To this is attached a larger 1-1/2 story square brick building dating to 1964, when the museum and library were organized.  The addition houses Monroe memorabilia, and a small library containing volumes similar to those that might have been in Monroe's library.  The museum also houses a collection of furnishings and other artifacts belonging to the Monroes, although most date to the 19th century.

The outside includes a memorial garden to James Monroe, which features a bust of him sculpted by Margaret French Cresson, daughter of Daniel Chester French.

This building, composed of three separate 19th century structures later joined together, occupies a site said by tradition to be the law office of future United States President James Monroe from 1786 to 1789. Monroe had prior to this time served in the Virginia House of Delegates and in the Congress of the Confederation, from which he resigned in 1786. In 1788, he was a delegate to the Virginia ratifying convention for the United States Constitution.  He initially opposed adoption until a Bill of Rights could be added.

Monroe's law office was acquired in 1928 by Laurence Hoes, a Monroe family descendant who established the James Monroe Memorial Foundation (see: www.monroefoundation.org) to manage the property. He accumulated a variety of artifacts related to his illustrious ancestor, restored the property, and opened it as a museum. In 1964, the addition was built, and the Monroe Foundation gave the property to the state.  It is now managed by a board consisting of members of the Monroe Foundation and the regents of the University of Mary Washington.

See also
List of National Historic Landmarks in Virginia
National Register of Historic Places listings in Fredericksburg, Virginia
Presidential memorials in the United States

References

External links

Monroe Foundation history
James Monroe Law Office Museum and Memorial Library - University of Mary Washington website
James Monroe Law Office Museum and Memorial Library - Park Service website
Photos
"Life Portrait of James Monroe", from C-SPAN's American Presidents: Life Portraits, broadcast from the James Monroe Memorial Museum, April 12, 1999

Commercial buildings on the National Register of Historic Places in Virginia
Museums in Fredericksburg, Virginia
Presidential museums in Virginia
Libraries in Virginia
Commercial buildings completed in 1786
National Historic Landmarks in Virginia
Georgian architecture in Virginia
Monroe
Law Office
National Register of Historic Places in Fredericksburg, Virginia
Historic district contributing properties in Virginia
University of Mary Washington
Law offices
Legal history of Virginia